Jane Margaret Hawkins is an American mathematician who works as a professor of mathematics at University of North Carolina at Chapel Hill. Her research concerns dynamical systems and complex dynamics, including cellular automata and Julia sets. More recent research has included work on cellular automata models for the spread of HIV, Hepatitis C and Ebola.

Education and career
Hawkins earned a B.A. in mathematics from the College of the Holy Cross, a Jesuit college in Worcester, Massachusetts, and received a Marshall Scholarship for graduate studies in the U.K. She then moved to England for graduate studies, receiving her Ph.D. from University of Warwick in 1981 under the supervision of Klaus Schmidt. Her dissertation, Type III Diffeomorphisms of Manifolds, concerned dynamical systems and ergodic theory.

She taught at the State University of New York, Stony Brook from 1980 to 1987, before moving to the University of North Carolina at Chapel Hill.

Her book Ergodic Dynamics was published by Springer in 2021.

Service
In 2004, Hawkins presented testimony to a subcommittee of the House Committee on Appropriations in support of grants to mathematical research, and again in 2012. She served as Treasurer of the American Mathematical Society, chair of the AMS Investment Committee, and Board of Trustees Member from 2011 until February 1, 2021. Hawkins has done a lot of outreach for women in mathematics, most notably participating in the George Washington University's Summer Program for Women in Math (SPWM) as a faculty member, guest lecturer, and panel moderator between 1999 and its final year in 2013.

Recognition
Hawkins was the first female valedictorian at the College of the Holy Cross.  In 2012, Hawkins became an inaugural fellow of the American Mathematical Society.

Personal
Hawkins is married to mathematician Michael E. Taylor, whom she credits with encouraging her with continuing in research.

References

External links
 Home page

Living people
20th-century American mathematicians
21st-century American mathematicians
American women mathematicians
Cellular automatists
College of the Holy Cross alumni
Alumni of the University of Warwick
University of North Carolina at Chapel Hill faculty
Fellows of the American Mathematical Society
20th-century women mathematicians
21st-century women mathematicians
Year of birth missing (living people)
20th-century American women
21st-century American women
Marshall Scholars